Loch Ericht (Scottish Gaelic, Loch Eireachd) is a freshwater loch on the border between the former Perthshire, now Perth and Kinross and the former Inverness-shire, now Highlands Council areas of Scotland. It has a north-east to south-west orientation. The village of Dalwhinnie lies at the north east end of the loch. Loch Ericht is the tenth largest freshwater lake in Scotland and has a good reputation for its trout fishing and Ferox trout. 

Loch Ericht occupies a major glacial breach cut through the former main Grampian divide from Ben Nevis over Ben Alder to the Cairngorms. The breach exploits the Loch Ericht Fault, a major feature of the Caledonian Orogeny, parallel to the Great Glen Fault and other NE-SW faults. The preglacial col in the former divide at Beinn Bheoil - Stob an Aonaich Mhoir is estimated by Linton to have been at 650m asl. With the loch bed being at 200m asl, ice has excavated a trench at least 450 m deep.  The glacier has carried erratic boulders of Rannoch granite far down the flanks of Strath Spey.  A secondary breach was cut between The Fara (Am Faireamh) and Geal Charn (Drumochter) thus beheading the Pattack catchment. The present watershed has been displaced about ten miles north-east to Dalwhinnie 

The loch is part of a hydro-electric scheme and is dammed at both ends. Water flows into the northern end via the Cuaich Aqueduct. The low northern barrage is located on the former natural watershed, raising the natural level of the loch slightly. The Corrievarkie pumped-storage hydroelectricity project is planned to hold 22 million cubic metres of water in the hills above the lake. If built, it would have a power of 600 MW for 24 hours.

Loch Ericht is surrounded by a number of Munros, including Ben Alder (1148 metres), Geal-Chàrn (1132 metres). and the Drumochter hills on the SE side. Traditional hunting areas border the loch. These are called forests; the chief of which is Ben Alder Forest.

Mapping
Loch Ericht is covered by

 Ordnance Survey Explorer map 393 (1:25000) Ben Alder, Loch Ericht and Loch Laggan and
 Ordnance Survey Landranger map 42 (1:50000) Glen Garry and Loch Rannoch.

References

Lochs of Highland (council area)
Freshwater lochs of Scotland
Lochs of Perth and Kinross
LEricht